Approaching Silence is a compilation album of ambient music by David Sylvian (along with Frank Perry and Robert Fripp) collecting the tracks from the 1991 limited release Ember Glance: The Permanence of Memory installation soundtrack CD as well as the soundtrack cassette from the installation "Redemption" (with Robert Fripp). The exhibition ran from 30 August 1994 to 18 September, at the P3 Gallery in Tokyo.

It was released on 5 October 1999 on Virgin Records (CDVE 943).

Track listing
"The Beekeeper's Apprentice" (Perry, Sylvian) – 32:56 
"Epiphany" (Sylvian) – 2:32 
"Approaching Silence" (Sylvian) – 38:17

Personnel
Robert Fripp – effects (3)
David Sylvian – art director, engineer (1, 2), instruments, sound, lights (exhibition), installation concept and creation
Frank Perry – Noan bells, bowed Gong, Finger bells
Technical
Yuka Fujii – art director 
Shinya Fujiwara – photography (front cover)
Anton Corbijn – photography (back cover)
Ari Marcopoulos – photography
Vaughan Oliver – art design
Chriss Bigg – design
Martin Andersen – design
Dave Kent – engineer (3)
Noel Harris – engineer (1, 2)

References 

1999 compilation albums
David Sylvian compilation albums
Virgin Records compilation albums